The 1975 WCT International, also known as the Bologna Open or Bologna WCT, was a men's tennis tournament played on indoor carpet courts that was part of the Green Group of the 1975 World Championship Tennis circuit and took place  in Bologna, Italy. It was the third edition of the tournament and was held from 6 February through 12 February 1975. Second-seeded Björn Borg won the singles title and earned $12,000 first prize money.

Finals

Singles
 Björn Borg defeated  Arthur Ashe 7–6(7–4), 4–6, 7–6(7–4)
 It was Borg's 2nd singles title of the year and the 10th of his career.

Doubles
 Paolo Bertolucci /  Adriano Panatta defeated  Arthur Ashe /  Tom Okker 6–3, 3–6, 6–3

References

External links
 ATP tournament profile
 ITF tournament edition details

WCT International
1975 World Championship Tennis circuit
WCT International
February 1975 sports events in Europe